Steve Davidson (born 1958) is an American science fiction editor. He has been the editor of Amazing Stories since 2012.

Amazing Stories
Davidson acquired Amazing Stories in 2012, and restarted it as a website. The magazine was revived as a print publication in 2018 following a Kickstarter campaign, which raised over $30,000.

Anthologies
 The Best of Amazing Stories: The 1926 Anthology  (2014) with Jean Marie Stine
 The Best of Amazing Stories: The 1927 Anthology  (2015) with Stine
 The Best of Amazing Stories: The 1940 Anthology: Special Retro-Hugo Edition  (2015) with Stine
 The Best of Amazing Stories: The 1928 Anthology  (2016) with Stine
 The Best of Amazing Stories: The 1929 Anthology  (2017) with Stine
 The Best of Amazing Stories: The 1930 Anthology  (2018) with Stine
 The Best of Amazing Stories: The 1931 Anthology  (2020) with Stine

References

External links

Davidson, Steve, Encyclopedia of Science Fiction

Living people
Science fiction editors
American speculative fiction editors
Male speculative fiction editors
1958 births